In mathematics, a noncommutative unique factorization domain is a noncommutative ring with the unique factorization property.

Examples
The ring of Hurwitz quaternions, also known as integral quaternions. A quaternion a = a0 + a1i + a2j + a3k is integral if either all the coefficients ai are integers or all of them are half-integers.

 All free associative algebras.

References
 P.M. Cohn, "Noncommutative unique factorization domains", Transactions of the American Mathematical Society 109:2:313-331 (1963). full text
 R. Sivaramakrishnan, Certain number-theoretic episodes in algebra, CRC Press, 2006,

Notes

Ring theory
Number theory